Mitilanotherium is an extinct genus of giraffes from the Pliocene and Pleistocene of Europe.

It was a medium-sized giraffid, resembling the modern okapi, with two long ossicones directly above its eyes, and relatively long and slender limbs. Fossils have been found in Greece, Romania, Ukraine, and Spain.

References

 Classification of Mammals by Malcolm C. McKenna and Susan K. Bell

Prehistoric giraffes
Prehistoric even-toed ungulate genera
Extinct mammals of Europe
Pliocene even-toed ungulates